Brentford Football Club is an English professional football club based in Brentford, Hounslow, London. Between 1897 and 1920, the first team competed in the London League, Southern League and Western League. Since 1920, the first team has competed in the Football League, the Premier League and other nationally and internationally organised competitions. All managers who have managed at least one first team match are listed below.

From Brentford's formation in 1889 and until 1900, the club's first team was run by a committee. William Lewis was appointed as the Bees' first official secretary-manager in May 1900. Fred Halliday was at the helm for Brentford's first ever Football League fixture in August 1920. The club has had 44 full-time managers, with the most recent appointment being Thomas Frank on 16 October 2018.

Brentford's most successful manager was Harry Curtis, who after being appointed in May 1926, won the Third Division South and Second Division titles in the 1932–33 and 1934–35 seasons respectively and won promotion to First Division for the first time in the club's history. Curtis recorded Brentford's highest-ever league finish (fifth in 1935–36) and the club topped the First Division table for three consecutive months during the 1937–38 season. Brentford also won the 1935 London Senior Cup, the 1942 London War Cup and reached the FA Cup sixth round three times during Curtis' tenure.

Brentford has never won a senior competitive cup (the club has reached the 1985, 2001 and 2011 Football League Trophy Finals), but several other managers have won silverware in the form of league championships: Malky MacDonald (Fourth Division, 1962–63), Phil Holder (Third Division, 1991–92), Ron Noades (Third Division, 1998–99) and Andy Scott (League Two, 2008–09).

The majority of Brentford's managers have been English, with Scotland being the next-best represented (Jimmy Bain, Malky MacDonald, John Docherty and Frank McLintock). Uwe Rösler (Germany) was Brentford's first overseas manager.

An overhaul of the club's management structure prior to the beginning of the 2015–16 season saw the manager's position redefined and renamed as that of a "head coach". Marinus Dijkhuizen was the first appointment to the new role on 1 June 2015. Dane Thomas Frank was appointed head coach in October 2018 and took the club to successive Championship playoff Finals in 2020 and 2021. Frank's victory in the latter Final made him the second man to manage Brentford to promotion from the second-tier, the first Brentford manager to win promotion via the playoffs and the first Brentford manager to manage in the Premier League.

Managerial history

1889–1926: Early Southern League years and election to the Football League
In the early years of Brentford, first team affairs were run by a committee involving any or all of the club's directors, secretary, trainer or captain, who presided over the selection of the team and the arrangement of friendly fixtures. For 11 years after the club's formation in 1889, leading figures in the running of the first team included secretaries Archer Green, C. West, A. E. Harriss, William Brown, J. Hinton-Bailey and captain J. J. K. Curtis.

Fresh off the back of wins in the London Senior Cup and Middlesex Senior Cup in the 1897–98 season, Brentford were elected into the Southern League and commenced play in Second Division London in the 1898–99 season. William Lewis took over as the club's first official manager in August 1900, leading the club to the Second Division title in his first season. Former Everton secretary-manager Dick Molyneux replaced him in May 1903 and together with his successors William Brown and Fred Halliday, kept Brentford in the First Division. Halliday brought silverware to Griffin Park in the shape of the Southern Professional Charity Cup in the 1908–09 season. With league form faltering, Halliday resigned from his position in November 1912 and was replaced by Dusty Rhodes, who could not prevent the Bees from slipping back into the Second Division at the end of the 1912–13 season.

Competitive football was halted for the duration of the First World War in 1915 and play resumed in 1919, with Brentford being elevated to the Southern League First Division and Fred Halliday, in his second spell as manager, recording a mid-table finish. Brentford were elected into the Football League as founder members of the Third Division South in 1920 and Halliday guided the club to a 15th-place finish before leaving the manager's position for a second time. Archie Mitchell took over as manager, presiding over some forgettable seasons before Halliday was reinstated for the third time in December 1924, successfully gaining re-election at the end of a torrid 1924–25 season. Halliday managed a mid-table finish in 1925–26, before leaving his position for the final time at the end of the season.

1926–1949: March up the leagues and First Division heyday 
Former Gillingham manager Harry Curtis was appointed Brentford manager in May 1926 and the most successful period of the club's history began. Curtis' team won all 21 home games in the 1929–30 Third Division South, a national record which still stands. The team consistently challenged for promotion and buoyed by the inspired triple-signing from Middlesbrough of Jack Holliday, Billy Scott and Herbert Watson, Curtis' team won the Third Division South championship in the 1932–33 season and the Second Division/London Challenge Cup double two years later. In Brentford's debut season in the First Division, Curtis led the club to its highest-ever league placing of 5th and secured 6th-place finishes in the following two seasons. Curtis' wheeler-dealer skills in the transfer market kept Brentford competitive in the league, making a profit on the sale of players and developing his signings into internationals, including Billy Scott and Les Smith (England), David McCulloch, Bobby Reid and Duncan McKenzie (Scotland) and Idris Hopkins (Wales).

Brentford reached the sixth round of the FA Cup for the first time in March 1938 and led the First Division for three months earlier in the 1937–38 season, but the run of success was brought to an end by the outbreak of the Second World War in 1939. Curtis added further silverware to the Griffin Park trophy room during the war years, winning the 1942 London War Cup in what is to date, Brentford's only Wembley triumph. A dearth of players up to the standard of the mid-1930s squad put Brentford into decline in the early post-war years, with the club's relegation to the Second Division in 1947 preceding Curtis' resignation in February 1949. The bright spot of the period were runs to the sixth round of the FA Cup in 1946 and 1949.

1949–1978: Decline and financial woes 
Jackie Gibbons took over as manager in February 1949, successfully avoiding relegation to the Third Division South, before a failure to progress beyond a couple of mid-table Second Division finishes led him to resign in August 1952. Harry Curtis' longtime assistant Jimmy Bain steadied the ship until Tommy Lawton took over as player/manager in January 1953. An awful start to the 1953–54 season led Lawton to resign and the appointment of Bill Dodgin, Sr. failed to improve matters, with Brentford suffering relegation to the Third Division South in May 1954. It was only after the appointment of Malky MacDonald in May 1957 (who had returned to the club after serving as a player and coach under Harry Curtis in the late 1940s) that fortunes changed. Like his predecessors since the Second World War, MacDonald relied on products of the club's youth system. The goals of homegrown forwards Jim Towers and George Francis fired the Bees to 2nd and 3rd-place finishes in the 1957–58 and 1958–59 seasons respectively, before their sales in 1961 cut off the team's goal supply. The Brentford board also reduced the number of playing staff to 16, with six players being retained on a part-time basis, which led to the club suffering relegation to the Fourth Division in 1962. MacDonald's big money signings of John Dick, Johnny Brooks and Billy McAdams completed an all-international forward line and the team won the 1962–63 Fourth Division championship at a canter.

MacDonald's former trainer Tommy Cavanagh built on his good work, missing out on promotion to the Second Division by two points and winning the London Challenge Cup in the 1964–65 season, but with Brentford staring at relegation in April 1966, Cavanagh was sacked. His replacement Billy Gray could not keep the club in the Third Division and after a takeover bid by Queens Park Rangers in January 1967, Jimmy Sirrel was appointed manager. The one positive moment of Sirrel's cash-strapped reign was winning the 1966–67 London Challenge Cup and it was Frank Blunstone who brought the good times back to Griffin Park, finishing 3rd in the 1971–72 season to secure promotion to the Third Division with a squad of just 14 players. After failing to preserve the club's third-tier status and falling-out with the board, Blunstone resigned in July 1973. Mike Everitt and John Docherty failed to compete in the Fourth Division, before promotion back to the third-tier was accomplished under Bill Dodgin, Jr. in the 1977–78 season.

1978–2000: Rooted in the third-tier 
In 1978, Brentford began a period of 14 consecutive seasons in the Third Division, finishing mostly in mid-table and narrowly avoiding relegation under Frank McLintock in 1983–84. McLintock took Brentford to the 1985 Football League Trophy Final, which was lost 3–1 to Wigan Athletic. Following the appointment of McLintock's assistant Steve Perryman in February 1987, the foundations were set for a promotion bid after Perryman's signings of strikers Dean Holdsworth and Gary Blissett. Brentford reached the sixth round of the FA Cup and the semi-finals of the Football League Trophy in 1988–89 and despite Perryman's shock resignation on the eve of the 1990–91 season, his assistant Phil Holder took over and led the Bees into their first playoff campaign in May 1991 and to promotion to the second-tier as champions 12 months later. Holder's Bees were relegated from the newly renamed First Division at the first time of asking, but challenged for promotion from the Second Division under David Webb in 1994–95 and 1996–97, failing in the playoffs on both occasions.

By the time Webb took over the ownership of the club and replaced himself with Eddie May in August 1997, the sales of key players Nicky Forster, Marcus Bent, Paul Smith, Barry Ashby, Martin Grainger and Carl Asaba left too great a void to fill and May lasted just three months in the job. Brentford were relegated at the end of the 1997–98 season under Micky Adams. Ron Noades took over the club as chairman in June 1998 and appointed himself manager, with support from coaches Ray Lewington, Terry Bullivant and Brian Sparrow. A cash injection saw the Bees win the Third Division title at the first attempt and return straight back to the Second Division, claiming the championship with a final-day win over eventual runners-up Cambridge United at the Abbey Stadium.

2000–2014: Near-misses and turnaround 
Noades' signings of forward Lloyd Owusu, midfielders Paul Evans and Gavin Mahon and central defenders Darren Powell and Ívar Ingimarsson in 1998 and 1999 formed the bedrock of the team which reached the 2001 Football League Trophy Final under Ray Lewington and the 2002 Second Division Playoff Final under Steve Coppell. The nucleus of the squad up was broken up during the 2002 off-season and the administration-threatened club went into decline under Coppell's replacement Wally Downes. Martin Allen replaced Downes in March 2004 and pulled off "The Great Escape" to preserve Brentford's Second Division status on the final day of the 2003–04 season. Allen assembled a competitive "two bob" team which finished in the playoff positions in the newly named League One in the 2004–05 and 2005–06 seasons and enjoyed two runs to the fifth round of the FA Cup. After the playoff failure in May 2006, the squad broke up and Allen resigned after failing to secure funding from the board for replacement players. Brentford finished bottom of League One in the 2006–07 season, with Leroy Rosenior at the helm until being replaced by youth team manager Scott Fitzgerald in November 2006.

Terry Butcher was named as manager in April 2007 and a potential double relegation into non-League football was averted by his assistant Andy Scott, who replaced Butcher in December 2007 and steered the club to the League Two championship in the 2008–09 season. Despite runs to the League Cup fourth round and the 2011 Football League Trophy Final, Scott was sacked halfway through the 2010–11 season, with Nicky Forster taking over until the end of the campaign. An overhaul of Brentford's management structure by owner Matthew Benham in the 2011 off-season saw Uwe Rösler appointed as Brentford's first overseas manager. Rösler took Brentford to the fourth round of the FA Cup and the 2013 League One Playoff Final in the 2012–13 season, before leaving in December 2013 and being replaced by former sporting director Mark Warburton, who built on Rösler's good work to secure automatic promotion to the Championship at the end of the 2013–14 season. Warburton's sole season in charge in the Championship ended in a playoff semi-final defeat to Middlesbrough.

2014–present: Promotion to the second-tier 
After a second overhaul of the management structure in four years, Mark Warburton was succeeded by head coach Marinus Dijkhuizen on 1 June 2015. A tumultuous start to the 2015–16 season saw Dijkhuizen replaced after 9 matches by Development Squad manager Lee Carsley, who stabilised the club's league position before Dean Smith was appointed head coach on 30 November 2015. Smith guided Brentford to consecutive top-10 finishes in the 2015–16, 2016–17 and 2017–18 seasons before his departure in October 2018. After serving for two years as assistant head coach to Dean Smith, Thomas Frank was promoted into the role of head coach in October 2018 and guided Brentford to the 2020 Championship play-off final, which was lost to West London rivals Fulham. At the time of Frank's 100th match in charge in October 2020, he had the highest winning percentage of any Brentford manager to manage 100 or more matches. Frank's team went one better during the 2020–21 season and won promotion to the Premier League after a 2–0 victory over Swansea City in the 2021 Championship play-off final. In October 2022, Frank achieved the feat of having won more of his first 200 matches than any Brentford head coach or manager to also reach 200.

Managers

Assistant managers

Records

Awards

Football League Manager of the Month

Other awards 
League Managers Association Performance of the Week:
Ron Noades – Brentford 3–0 West Bromwich Albion, League Cup first round, second leg, 18 August 1998)
Andy Scott – Darlington 1–3 Brentford, League Two, 25 April 2009
Mark Warburton – Brentford 4–0 Wolverhampton Wanderers, League One, 29 November 2014
 Thomas Frank
 Brentford 7–0 Luton Town, Championship, 30 November 2019
 Fulham 0–2 Brentford, Championship, 20 June 2020
Bournemouth 0–1 Brentford, Championship, 24 April 2021
Brentford 2–0 Arsenal, Premier League, 13 August 2021
Chelsea 1–4 Brentford, Premier League, 2 April 2022
Brentford 4–0 Manchester United, Premier League, 13 August 2022
Manchester City 1–2 Brentford, Premier League, 12 November 2022
Brentford 3–1 Liverpool, Premier League, 2 January 2023
 London Football Awards Manager of the Year:
Mark Warburton (2013–14)
Thomas Frank (2019–20)

 DBU Coach of the Year: Thomas Frank (2020)

Notes

References
General
 
 
 

Specific

External links 
 Soccerbase manager history of Brentford

 
Managers
Brentford